Harry Flanroy Sydney III (born June 26, 1959) is a former professional American football player whose position was running back.  He played six seasons in the National Football League (NFL) for the San Francisco 49ers and Green Bay Packers after three years with the Denver Gold and Memphis Showboats of the USFL. He now resides in Green Bay, Wisconsin, where he operates a not-for-profit male mentoring program called "My Brother's Keeper", and was the head football coach of the West High School Wildcats.

Highlights
Harry Sydney played on the 1988 and 1989 San Francisco 49ers Super Bowl championship teams. He was the captain of the special team. He earned another Super Bowl ring as running backs coach for the 1996 Green Bay Packers.  He served as RB Coach from 1995 to 1999.  He is also 11th all-time in rushing yards for the USFL.

Sydney is the only NFL player who has caught touchdown passes from both Joe Montana and Brett Favre.

Post-career life 
Harry is also a public speaker as well as co-host of a Green Bay, Wisconsin sports radio show.

Harry Sydney started his own Male Mentoring Business called My Brother's Keeper. It mentors almost all ages of boys to men who are having issues with life struggles.

References

1959 births
Living people
American football running backs
Kansas Jayhawks football players
University of Kansas alumni
San Francisco 49ers players
Green Bay Packers players
Denver Gold players
Memphis Showboats players
Sportspeople from Petersburg, Virginia
National Football League replacement players